Quasten is a surname. Notable people with the surname include:

Johannes Quasten (1900–1987), German Catholic theologian and academic
Paul Quasten (born 1985), Dutch-born Czech footballer